N. Trivikrama Rao was an Indian film producer, director and screenwriter in Telugu cinema. He was the younger brother of N. T. Rama Rao and the co-owner of National Art Theatre, Madras, a production house under which he has co-produced 40 feature films alongside N. T. Rama Rao. He has received four National Film Awards, three Andhra Pradesh state Nandi Awards and two Filmfare Awards South.

Awards
National Film Awards

1954 - Certificate of Merit for Best Feature Film in Telugu (producer) for Thodu Dongalu
1960 - Certificate of Merit for Best Feature Film in Telugu, (producer) for  Seetharama Kalyanam
1970 - National Film Award for Best Feature Film in Telugu (producer) for  Varakatnam

Nandi Awards
1965 - Second Best Feature Film - Silver - Sri Krishna Pandaveeyam
1970 - Second Best Feature Film - Silver - Kodalu Diddina Kapuram
1971 - Second Best Feature Film - Silver - Sri Krishna Satya

Selected filmography
Producer
Sri Krishna Satya (1971)
Varakatnam (1970) 
Ummadi Kutumbam (1967) 
Gulebakavali Katha (1962) 
Seetharama Kalyanam (1961)  
Jayasimha (1955) 
Thodu Dongalu  (1954) 
Pichi Pullayya (1953)

References 

Living people
Telugu film producers
Telugu film directors
Telugu screenwriters
Film producers from Andhra Pradesh
Screenwriters from Andhra Pradesh
Film directors from Andhra Pradesh
20th-century Indian film directors
Year of birth missing (living people)